MagsBC (also known as the British Columbia Association of Magazine Publishers (BCAMP)) is a member-run industry organization that meets the needs of British Columbia’s magazine publishing industry.

Board and staff 
As of 2012, the MagsBC Board and staff are composed of: 
 President, Jenn Farrell, editorial collective member, SubTerrain
Vice-President, Steve Ceron, publisher, Arrival
Treasurer, Darren Bernaerdt, publisher, Pacific Rim Magazine
Secretary, Stacey McLachlan, assistant editor, Western Living
Directors-at-large
Kristin Cheung, managing editor, Ricepaper
Maia Odegaard, online coordinator and administrative assistant, TC Transcontinental
Gary Davies, president, Canada Wide Media Ltd.
Staff
Sylvia Skene, executive director

Events
Word on the Street, Vancouver, September 2009 
BC Book and Magazine Week, Vancouver, April 18–25, 2009

References

External links
 Official website

Organizations based in British Columbia